Premalu Pellillu is a 1974 Indian Telugu-language drama film, produced by D. Bhaskara Rao under the Sri Ananta Lakshmi Art Pictures banner and directed by V. Madhusudhana Rao. It stars Akkineni Nageswara Rao, Jayalalitha, and Sharada with music composed by M. S. Viswanathan.

Plot
Dr. Madhu an idealist who has a great appreciation for life. He loves a vainglory woman Indira belonging to an affluent family and naturally has the tendency of getting whatever she determines. Right Now the topic of marriage arrives, Madhu's mother an orthodox woman doesn't like the alliance when Madhu takes a step forward and marries her. Soon after, everything dramatically changes due to Indira's lavish lifestyle which is not approved by Madhu. He tries to convince her in many ways but the latter doesn't listen. Time passes, the couple is blessed with two children. Indira doesn't show any love & affection towards her kids and throws Madhu into huge debts. Things get worst when both think of filing for a divorce. Indira leaves her in-law's house even heartlessly discarding her kids. Devastated Madhu becomes mentally ill and takes sleep inducing injections to forget his troubles. At this juncture, Madhu's sister Saroja introduces her friend Anuradha when spotting her applicable nature Madhu's mother makes him remarry Anuradha. But Madhu finds it difficult to have a happy life with Anuradha. However, Anuradha, as a confident woman keeps her loneliness aside, looks after the kids well and also transforms Madhu to a normal individual. Meanwhile, Indira realizes her mistake, but it is already too late.

Cast

Soundtrack

Music composed by M. S. Viswanathan. Music released on Audio Company.

Reception
On 25 January 1974, Griddaluru Gopalrao of Zamin Ryot gave a mixed review for the film. He termed it watchable, but criticized the poorly made romantic scenes and humour. Andhra Jyothi critic Bharadwaja in his review dated 14 January 1974 appreciated the performances and the soundtrack.

References

External links

Indian drama films
1970s Telugu-language films
Films directed by V. Madhusudhana Rao
Films scored by M. S. Viswanathan